Myitkyina Township is a township (sub district) of Myitkyina District in Kachin State, Burma. The principal town is Myitkyina.

Demographics

2014

The 2014 Myanmar Census reported that Myitkyina Township had a population of 306,949. The population density was 63.8 people per km². The census reported that the median age was 24.5 years, and 94 males per 100 females. There were 50,583 households; the mean household size was 5.4.

References

Townships of Kachin State